Sione Tahaafe (born 8 July 1958), is a Tongan former rugby union player who played as number 8.

Career
Tahaafe started his career in 1974, after he left Tonga to go in New Zealand, and then in Australia where he played in the Shute Shield with Eastwood Rugby Club, with he won the Ken Catchpole Award in 1986. Later, he moved in France to play for Stade Montchaninois until 1995, to play later for Stade Dijonnais Côte D'Or until 2000. In 2001, Tahaafe retired to coach an under-19 team in Sens.

International career
Tahaafe debuted for Tonga in the 1987 Rugby World Cup in Australia and New Zealand, where he only played against Canada national rugby union team, on 24 May 1987, in Napier, with this match being his only international cap.

References

External links

1958 births
Living people
Tonga international rugby union players
Tongan rugby union players
Tongan expatriates in France
Tongan expatriates in Australia
Rugby union number eights